Langsdorfia leucrocraspedontis is a moth in the family Cossidae. It is found in Peru.

References

Natural History Museum Lepidoptera generic names catalog

Hypoptinae